Neil Frederick Clay Martin (born 19 October 1969) is an English former first-class cricketer.

Martin was born at Birmingham, where he was educated at King Edward's School, and attended Durham University followed by Birmingham University. He later went up to Keble College, Oxford. While studying at Oxford, he played first-class cricket for Oxford University, making his debut against Durham at Oxford in 1994. He played first-class cricket for Oxford until 1995, making a total of twelve appearances. He scored 84 runs in his twelve matches, with a high score of 26, though his primary role in the Oxford side was a right-arm medium pace bowler. Martin struggled to take wickets against county opposition, with just 8 wickets at an expensive average of 75.37.

References

External links

1969 births
Living people
People from Birmingham, West Midlands
People educated at King Edward's School, Birmingham
Alumni of Keble College, Oxford
English cricketers
Oxford University cricketers
Alumni of Durham University
Alumni of the University of Birmingham